is a private university at Toyota, Aichi, Japan. The predecessor of the school was founded in 1912, and it was chartered as a university in 1959.

External links
 

Educational institutions established in 1912
Private universities and colleges in Japan
Engineering universities and colleges in Japan
Aichi Institute of Technology
1912 establishments in Japan
Toyota, Aichi